Evgeny Markovich Shvidler (born 23 March 1964), also known as Eugene Shvidler, is a Soviet-born billionaire oil businessman. He made his fortune during the privatization of Russian industry. As of October 2021, his net worth is estimated at US$1.9 billion. Shvidler was sanctioned by the British government in March 2022 in the wake of the Russian invasion of Ukraine.

Early life
Shvidler was born in Ufa, Russian SFSR, Soviet Union (now Russia), into a Jewish family. His father is Soviet geologist Mark Iosifovich Shvidler. He received a degree in mathematics from the Gubkin Institute of Petrochemicals and Natural Gas and an MBA from Fordham University.

Career
Early in his career he worked for Deloitte & Touche in New York and became a U.S. citizen. He later returned to Russia, where he teamed up with Roman Abramovich to start the oil trading outfit Runicom S.A. In 1995, the men partnered to gain control of oil giant Sibneft "in an auction that some experts," according to the Irish Independent, "suspect of having been rigged"; Shvidler joined Sibneft initially as senior Vice President and served as company president from 1998 until October 2005, when Russian state energy company Gazprom acquired Sibneft. For most of his tenure, Sibneft was Russia's fastest growing oil company in terms of production, and its most profitable in terms of earnings per barrel.

Shvidler is chairman of Millhouse LLC, the investment and asset management company he shares with Abramovich and their partners.

Personal life
Shvidler is married to Zara Shvidler and they have five children. He owns the Château Thénac vineyard in France, a £22 million ($37m) house in Belgravia, London, a $14.5 million home in Snowmass Village, Colorado, and the yacht Le Grand Bleu. Shvidler and Abramovich are known to be closely connected and several media reported Shvidler to be a “longstanding business partner” of Abramovich. In 2008, Shvidler and Abramovich purchased three houses in Snowmass Village, Colorado totaling over $62 million in real estate.

References

1964 births
Living people
Russian billionaires
American billionaires
Russian oligarchs
20th-century American Jews
American people of Russian-Jewish descent
Gabelli School of Business alumni
Russian businesspeople in the oil industry
Russian Jews
Soviet emigrants to the United States
People with acquired American citizenship
Russian businesspeople in the United Kingdom
Russian businesspeople in the United States
21st-century American Jews